Sir Thomas Walter Stringer  (4 November 1855 – 8 December 1944) was a New Zealand judge appointed to the King's Counsel.

Early life and career 
Stringer was born and raised in Christchurch. He was educated at Canterbury University College and was admitted as a barrister and solicitor in 1879. In 1882 he married Ada Davies. He became a Crown Solicitor is 1893, based in Christchurch. When the first ten appointments to the King' Counsel were made in June 1907 by Chief Justice Robert Stout, Stringer was one of two appointees from Christchurch. He was appointed to the Supreme Court in 1914.

Later life and death 
From 1927 to 1940 he was in charge of the War Pensions Appeal Board. He was appointed a Knight Bachelor in the 1928 New Year Honours. His wife, Ada Stringer, died in 1932. He died in Christchurch in 1944.

References 

1855 births
1944 deaths
People from Christchurch
University of Canterbury alumni
New Zealand King's Counsel
20th-century New Zealand judges
New Zealand Knights Bachelor